Sagamu or Ishagamu is an agglomeration of thirteen towns located in Ogun State along the Ibu River and Eruwuru Stream between Lagos and Ibadan, founded in the mid 19th century by members of the Remo branch of the Yoruba people in south-western Nigeria. The 13 towns are: Makun, Offin, Sonyindo, Epe, Ibido, Igbepa, Ado, Oko, Ipoji, Batoro, Ijoku, Ijagba and Latawa. It is the capital of Remo Kingdom, and the paramount ruler of the kingdom, the Akarigbo of Remo, has his palace is in the town of Offin.

The Sagamu region is underlain by major deposits of limestone, which is used in the city's major industry, the production of cement. Agricultural products of the region include cocoa and kola nuts. Sagamu is the largest kola nut collecting center in the country. The kola nut industry supports several secondary industries such as basket and rope manufacturing, which are used to store the kola nuts.

The city was founded in the mid-19th century when several small towns united for purpose of defense during the wars brought about by the fall of the Oyo Empire. Sagamu controlled the trade routes between the ports in the Niger Delta and the Yoruba mainland until the British occupied the city at the end of the 19th century. Sagamu has experienced both population and economic growth since the 1950s, due to its position between the cities of Ibadan and Lagos. The population in 1995 was 114,300 but 2007 estimates placed it as high as 228,382. The Olabisi Onabanjo University's college of medicine is located in Sagamu.

Sagamu (Offin - Ile) is the new seat of the Akarigbo of Remo ("King" or "Lord" of Remo), the traditional ruler of the Remo Kingdom. The former seat was located in a farther area of Offin. Four ruling families are eligible to wear the beaded crown of the Akarigbo, all descending from the first Oba, Akarigbo, a prince of the house of Oduduwa. The current Akarigbo was installed and crowned as King in 2017. Notable areas within Sagamu include Offin, Itunshokun, Sabo, Makun, Ajaka, Makun Station, Isale-oko, Isote, Epe, Soyindo, Surulere, Ijagba, Ewu-Oluwo, Ogijo, Simawa, GRA, Ijokun, Batoro. Ijebu language, a dialect of the Yoruba language, is spoken in Sagamu.

Administration 
The old Sagamu Local Government has been divided into Three(3) Local Council Development Areas namely Sagamu West LCDA, Sagamu Central LCDA and Sagamu South LCDA.

For Administrative convenience, Sagamu Local Government is divided into (15) Fifteen Political Wards, namely.

 Ward 1 – Oko, Epe & Itunla 1  
 Ward 2 – Oko, Epe Itunla II
 Ward 3 – AiyegbamijIjoku 
 Ward 4 – Sabo 1
 Ward 5 – Sabo II 
 Ward 6 – Itunsokun Oyebajo
 Ward 7 – Ijagba  
 Ward 8 – Latawa
 Ward 9 – Ode-lemo  
 Ward 10 – OgijojIkosi
 Ward 11 – Surulere  
 Ward 12 – Isote
 Ward 13 – Simawa 
 Ward 14 – Agbowa
 Ward 15 – Ibidojitun Alara

Notable people 

 Adebayo Ogunlesi, a businessman
 Anthony Joshua, a sportsperson
 Gbenga Daniel, a politician. 
Babatunde Adewale Ajayi, the current Sagamu king

Photo Gallery of Sagamu

External links

References 

 

 
Local Government Areas in Ogun State
Cities in Yorubaland
Cities in Nigeria